Jeżów may refer to:

Jeżów, Jawor County in Lower Silesian Voivodeship (south-west Poland)
Jeżów, Brzeziny County in Łódź Voivodeship (central Poland)
Jeżów, Piotrków County in Łódź Voivodeship (central Poland)
Jeżów, Lublin Voivodeship (east Poland)
Jeżów, Jędrzejów County in Świętokrzyskie Voivodeship (south-central Poland)
Jeżów, Końskie County in Świętokrzyskie Voivodeship (south-central Poland)
Jeżów, Ostrowiec County in Świętokrzyskie Voivodeship (south-central Poland)